The Newcastle Jets FC, also known as the Newcastle Jets Women, is an Australian football (soccer) team. Founded in 2008, it is the affiliated women's team of Newcastle Jets. The team competes in the country's National Women's Football competition, the A-League Women, under licence from The Australian Professional Leagues (APL).

History

Establishment

Formed in 2008, following the Australian women's national soccer team's most successful experience at a FIFA Women's World Cup and the call for the establishment of a professional women's league, the W-League was initially composed of eight teams: Adelaide United, Brisbane Roar, Central Coast Mariners, Melbourne Victory, Newcastle Jets, Perth Glory, and Sydney FC. Seven of the eight teams were affiliated with men's Hyundai A-League clubs, and shared their names and colours to promote their brands. The eighth club was the Canberra-based Canberra United. Naming rights were secured by Westfield, a company co-founded by Frank Lowy.

Year-by-year

Stadium

The Newcastle Jets play their home matches at Newcastle International Sports Centre also known as Mcdonald Jones Stadium and occasionally at No.2 Sportsground in Newcastle. Before playing at the latter two venues the team played home matches at Wanderers Oval, commonly known as Magic Park, located in Broadmeadow, a suburb of Newcastle, New South Wales. The stadium features 489 grandstand seats and additional bench seating around the field for a total capacity of 3,500. The pitch surface is grass. It is also the home field for NPL Northern NSW club Broadmeadow Magic FC and occasionally the Newcastle Jets A-League Mens team. However after a successful attempt in 2017-18 to play some of the team's home matches before the Men's games as Double Headers the club announced in September 2017 that the upcoming season would consist of 4 Double Headers with the Men's at Mcdonald Jones Home Stadium and the sole other home game being played at the No.2 Sportsground in Newcastle West which was also unveiled as the training ground for the W League and as a new home ground for the National Youth League sides as part of a partnership with Newcastle City Council.

Active Support
W-Jets Active are the supporter group for Newcastle Jets A-League Women's Team. The group formed after founding members attended the Women's World Cup in France in 2019. They attend all home games and as many away games as possible. The group prides itself on being inclusive, positive and loud. 
At the end of every season, the group run a poll on their social media and award a trophy to the player voted fan favourite. 
Winners to date: Claire Coelho 2019/20, Lauren Allan 2020/21, and Kirsty Fenton 2021/22.

Players

Current squad

Former players

Management

Current staff

Managerial history

See also
 List of top-division football clubs in AFC countries
 Women's soccer in Australia
 A-League Women records and statistics
 Australia women's national soccer team
 A-League Women Broadcasting

References

External links
 
W-League official website
Football Australia official website

 
Newcastle Jets FC
Women's soccer clubs in Australia
A-League Women teams
2008 establishments in Australia
Sports teams in Newcastle, New South Wales

pl:Newcastle United Jets#Sekcja kobiet